In mathematical physics, the Whitham equation is a non-local model for non-linear dispersive waves. 

The equation is notated as follows:This integro-differential equation for the oscillatory variable η(x,t) is named after Gerald Whitham who introduced it as a model to study breaking of non-linear dispersive water waves in 1967. Wave breaking – bounded solutions with unbounded derivatives – for the Whitham equation has recently been proven.  

For a certain choice of the kernel K(x − ξ) it becomes the Fornberg–Whitham equation.

Water waves
Using the Fourier transform (and its inverse), with respect to the space coordinate x and in terms of the wavenumber k:
 For surface gravity waves, the phase speed c(k) as a function of wavenumber k is taken as:

  while  

with g the gravitational acceleration and h the mean water depth. The associated kernel Kww(s) is, using the inverse Fourier transform:

since cww is an even function of the wavenumber k.

 The Korteweg–de Vries equation (KdV equation) emerges when retaining the first two terms of a series expansion of cww(k) for long waves with :

       

with δ(s) the Dirac delta function.

 Bengt Fornberg and Gerald Whitham studied the kernel Kfw(s) – non-dimensionalised using g and h:

The resulting integro-differential equation can be reduced to the partial differential equation known as the Fornberg–Whitham equation:

This equation is shown to allow for peakon solutions – as a model for waves of limiting height – as well as the occurrence of wave breaking (shock waves, absent in e.g. solutions of the Korteweg–de Vries equation).

Notes and references

Notes

References

Water waves
Partial differential equations
Equations of fluid dynamics